The 1967 Baltimore mayoral election saw the election of Thomas D'Alesandro III.

Nominations
Primary elections were held March 7.

Democratic primary

Republican primary

General election
The general election was held November 2.

References

Baltimore mayoral
Mayoral elections in Baltimore
Baltimore